Noel Lloyd George Blake (born 12 January 1962) is a former professional footballer and current coach. He was formerly the head coach of the England national under-19 football team. He played in the Football League for Aston Villa, Shrewsbury Town, Birmingham City, Portsmouth, Leeds United, Stoke City, Bradford City and Exeter City, and in the Scottish Football League for Dundee.

Playing career
Born in Kingston, Jamaica, Blake moved to England and played football with non-league side Sutton Coldfield Town. He was spotted by scouts at Aston Villa who signed Blake a year later. He struggled to force his way into the Villa side and went out on loan to Shrewsbury Town in 1982. He left Villa upon his return and joined local rivals Birmingham City. He quickly became a fan favourite with Birmingham as he scored against Villa in December 1982.

He spent two years with Birmingham before signing with Portsmouth on the south coast. Whilst he did enjoy some success at 'Pompey' winning promotion as Second Division runners-up in 1987, Blake had problems with racial abuse from his own supporters, at a time when racism was still rife in English football. After making over 150 appearances with Portsmouth, Blake joined Leeds United on a free transfer and he helped to club to promotion as Second Division champions in the 1989–90 season. However his opportunities were limited the following season and so he was sold to Stoke City just after promotion was achieved, with Howard Wilkinson looking to spend heavily on new players to build a squad capable of competing with the very best in the First Division.

Blake's old manager at Portsmouth Alan Ball tempted Blake to join him at Stoke City in 1990. Ball was sacked in February 1991 as Stoke went on to record their worst league position of 14th in the third tier. Stoke's new manager Lou Macari only used Blake sparingly and later joined Bradford City on loan in 1992. He joined Bradford permanently and latter played for Scottish side Dundee before ending his playing career with Exeter City.

Coaching career
Blake held the position of manager of Exeter City from January 2000 until September 2001.

A qualified coach and holder of the UEFA Pro Licence, Blake was appointed in February 2007 as one of the Football Association's National Coaches to work with players in England's youth teams and to assist with coach education. He was placed in charge of the England under-19 team in 2009, leading the side to the semi-finals of the UEFA European Under-19 Championship in both 2010 and 2012 before leaving the Football Association in June 2014.

On 1 July it was reported that Blake was about to become first-team coach at Blackpool. On 27 October Blake was put in temporary charge following the departure of Jose Riga. He left Blackpool in December 2014.

Personal life
Blake suffered a stroke in August 2015.

Honours
 Portsmouth 
 Football League Second Division runner-up: 1986–87
 Leeds United
 football League Second Division
winner: 1989-90

Career statistics

As a player

A.  The "Other" column constitutes appearances and goals in the Football League Trophy, Football League play-offs Full Members Cup.

As a manager

References

External links

1962 births
Living people
Sportspeople from Kingston, Jamaica
Sutton Coldfield Town F.C. players
Aston Villa F.C. players
Shrewsbury Town F.C. players
Birmingham City F.C. players
Portsmouth F.C. players
Leeds United F.C. players
Stoke City F.C. players
Bradford City A.F.C. players
Dundee F.C. players
Exeter City F.C. players
Exeter City F.C. managers
Scottish Football League players
English Football League players
Jamaican emigrants to the United Kingdom
Stoke City F.C. non-playing staff
Blackpool F.C. non-playing staff
Association football defenders
English football managers
English footballers
Association football player-managers
Black British sportsmen